Southern Rock Masters is a cover album by American southern rock band Molly Hatchet, was released on April 15, 2008 (see 2008 in music).

Track listing

Personnel 
Molly Hatchet
Phil McCormack – lead and backing vocals
Bobby Ingram – guitars, acoustic guitar, slide guitar, backing vocals, producer, mixing
Dave Hlubek – guitars
John Galvin – keyboards, backing vocals
Tim Lindsey – bass, backing vocals
Shawn Beamer – drums, percussion

Additional musicians
Charlie Daniels – lead vocals on "Free Bird"

Production
Paul Lapinski – engineer, mixing, mastering
Scott Fravala, Daryl Pheeneger – engineers

References

Molly Hatchet albums
2008 compilation albums
Covers albums
Cleopatra Records albums